Ghosthunters is a British paranormal documentary television series that originally aired from 1996 to 1997 on the Discovery Channel. The four-series program was produced by Inca Productions of Covent Garden, London (by producers Sheldon Greenberg and Eddie Babbage), hosted by Ian Cashmore, and narrated by William Woollard. Ian Cashmore also appeared in the promo for the American Syfy series Ghost Hunters.

Premise
Frequently aired on the Discovery Channel, Discovery Civilizations, and Discovery Science, the first two seasons explored contemporary research in the area of field parapsychology, largely by asking prominent researchers to explain and outline their best evidential cases, and interviewing witness while placing the cases in the context of parapsychology.

Notable researchers regularly featured on the programme include professors Archie Roy, David Fontana and Peter Fenwick.

Episodes

Series 1 (1996)
All episodes were first broadcast on Sundays.

Series 2 (1996)
All episodes were first broadcast on Sundays.

Series 3 (1996–1997)
These eight episodes were first screened between Sunday 8 December 1996 and Sunday 26 January 1997 (each episode was also repeated on the Wednesday night following the Sunday transmission).

Series 4 (1997)
The following eight episodes were first screened between Sunday 2 February 1997 and Sunday 23 March 1997 (each episode was also repeated on the Wednesday night following the Sunday transmission).

See also
 List of ghost films

References

External links 

 

1996 British television series debuts
1997 British television series endings
British documentary television series
British supernatural television shows
Discovery Channel original programming
English-language television shows
Paranormal television